In mathematics, the étale topos of a scheme X is the category of all étale sheaves on X. An étale sheaf is a sheaf on the étale site of X.

Definition
Let X be a scheme.

The category Ét(X) is the category of all étale schemes over X. The collection of all étale coverings of a étale scheme U over X i.e. an object in Ét(X) defines a Grothendieck pretopology on Ét(X) which in turn induces a Grothendieck topology, the étale topology on X. The category together with the étale topology on it is called the étale site on X.

The étale topos  of a scheme X is then the category of all sheaves of sets on the site Ét(X). Such sheaves are called étale sheaves on X. In other words, an étale sheaf  is a (contravariant) functor from the category Ét(X) to the category of sets satisfying the following sheaf axiom:

For each étale U over X and each étale covering  of U the sequence

is exact, where .

Topos theory
Sheaf theory